Seth D. DuCharme is an American attorney who served as the acting United States Attorney for the Eastern District of New York. DuCharme was appointed by Attorney General William Barr and sworn in on July 10, 2020, succeeding Richard Donoghue, who left his role to serve as principal associate deputy attorney general to Jeffrey A. Rosen.

Early life and education 
DuCharme is a native of Long Island, New York. He earned a Bachelor of Arts degree from Hamilton College and a Juris Doctor from the Fordham University School of Law.

Career 
After graduating from law school, DuCharme worked as a law clerk for Richard Owen of the United States District Court for the Southern District of New York. DuCharme joined the office of the United States Attorney for the Eastern District of New York after working as an attorney at Simpson Thacher & Bartlett. He also served at the United States Department of Justice in Washington, D.C. as principal associate deputy attorney general to Jeffrey A. Rosen and counselor to William Barr. 

In 2018, DuCharme was named criminal chief of the EDNY, where he managed national security and cybercrime prosecution. DuCharme was selected to serve as acting United States Attorney in July 2020, and was officially sworn in on July 10. On March 8, 2021, DuCharme announced his resignation as U.S. Attorney, effective March 19, 2021, and sent letters to President Biden and acting United States attorney general Monty Wilkinson to inform them. Following DuCharme's departure, Mark Lesko became acting U.S. Attorney.

In May 2021, DuCharme joined the law firm Bracewell LLP.

Personal life 
DuCharme is married to Dyan Finguerra-DuCharme, a trademark attorney at Pryor Cashman LLP.

References 

Living people
United States Attorneys for the Eastern District of New York
Hamilton College (New York) alumni
Fordham University School of Law alumni
Year of birth missing (living people)